The Alternative Splicing and Transcript Diversity database (ASTD) was a database of transcript variants maintained by the European Bioinformatics Institute from 2008 to 2012. It contained transcription initiation, polyadenylation and splicing variant data.

See also
 Alternative Splicing Annotation Project
 AspicDB
 RNA splicing

References

External links
https://web.archive.org/web/20111227225355/http://www.ebi.ac.uk/asd/

Genetics databases
Gene expression
RNA splicing
Science and technology in Cambridgeshire
South Cambridgeshire District